Gus Harrison Correctional Facility (ARF) is a Michigan prison, in Adrian, for adult male prisoners.

History
The prison was opened in 1991 and is named after the Michigan Department of Corrections's first director, Gus Harrison.

On August 9, 2009, Parr Highway Correctional Facility was consolidated into Gus Harrison Correctional Facility.

In early 2021, the facility was fined $6,300 over serious violations of Coronavirus regulations. At the time 187 employees had tested positive to the virus and one had died; in addition, 1465 prisoners tested positive and seven had died.

Facility
The prison has six housing units used for Michigan Department of Corrections male prisoners 18 years of age and older.

Security
The facility is surrounded by double fences with razor-ribbon wire and two gun towers. Electronic detection systems and patrol vehicles are also utilized to maintain perimeter security.

Services
The facility offers libraries, group counseling, substance-abuse treatment, and education programs. Onsite medical and dental care is supplemented by local hospitals and the Duane L. Waters Hospital in Jackson, Michigan.

Notable inmates
Chad Curtis, former major league baseball player convicted of sexual assault against three girl high school students.

See also

 List of Michigan state prisons

References

External links
 
 Michigan Department of Corrections

Prisons in Michigan
Buildings and structures in Lenawee County, Michigan
1991 establishments in Michigan